Bhramar Mukherjee is an Indian-American biostatistician, data scientist, professor and researcher. She is the John D. Kalbfleisch Collegiate Professor and the Chair of Department of Biostatistics, a professor of epidemiology at the University of Michigan. She serves as the associate director for Quantitative Data Sciences at University of Michigan Rogel Cancer Center. She has served as the past Chair for Committee of Presidents of Statistical Societies (COPSS) for a three-year term 2019-2021.

Mukherjee's research has been focused on the development and application of statistical methods in epidemiology, environmental health and disease risk assessment. She has authored over 350 articles in statistics, biostatistics, epidemiology and medical Journals. She has led several federally funded grants as a principal investigator. Her focus has been to integrate diverse data sources for efficient inference.

Mukherjee is a fellow of the American Statistical Association and the American Association for the Advancement of Science. She is an elected member of the International Statistical Institute. She was elected as a member of the National Academy of Medicine in 2022

Education 
Mukherjee was born and raised in Kolkata, India. She received her B.Sc. in statistics from Presidency College in Kolkata in 1994 and her M.Stat from Indian Statistical Institute in 1996. At the completion of her M.Stat, The Ramakrishna Mission awarded her the Debesh-Kamal scholarship for studying abroad and Mukherjee moved to the United States, where she received her M.S. in mathematical statistics in 1999 and then her Ph.D. in statistics in 2001, both from Purdue University. Her advisor was William J. Studden and her thesis title was "Optimal designs for estimating the path of a stochastic process".

Career 
After completing her Ph.D., Mukherjee joined University of Florida as an assistant professor of Statistics and taught there until 2006, when she left to join the University of Michigan as the John G. Searle Assistant Professorship. In 2009, she became associate professor and in 2013, full professor. She was awarded the John D. Kalbfleisch Collegiate Professorship at the University of Michigan in 2015. She was appointed the associate chair of Department of Biostatistics at University of Michigan in 2014 and became the first woman chair of the department in 2018.

In 2016, Mukherjee was appointed the associate director of cancer control and population studies at University of Michigan Rogel Cancer Center, where she led the Cancer Center's research on cancer screening, epidemiology and prevention, as well as research on cancer outcomes, disparities and new models of cancer care delivery. After 4 years in this role she transitioned as the newly appointed associate director for Quantitative Data Sciences in 2020.

Mukherjee is the founding director of a cross-disciplinary summer institute at the School of Public Health to train undergraduates at the intersection of big data and human health. She has served as the cohort development core co-director in the University of Michigan's Precision Health Initiative and leads the Center for Precision Health Data Science.

Mukherjee was the statistics editor for the American Journal of Preventive Medicine from 2013 to 2014, an Associate Editor of Statistics in Medicine from 2015 to 2018, and an Associate Editor of Biometrics from 2008 to 2018. She has served on the editorial board of the Harvard Data Science Review and Genetic Epidemiology.

Research and work 
Mukherjee's research has primarily focused on the development and application of statistical methods in epidemiology and disease risk assessment. Her interests include electronic health records, shrinkage methods, data integration, modeling of high dimensional exposure data and studies of gene-environment interaction. Her collaborations span in the areas of reproductive epidemiology, cancer epidemiology and environmental health. She has authored over 350 articles in scientific journals and has led several federally funded grants as principal investigator. Mukherjee is currently serving as one of the principal investigators of a large cohort building grant MI-CARES (Michigan Cancer and Research on the Environment Study), studying the impact of toxic exposures on cancer risks in Michigan residents.

One of the focal points of Mukherjee's research is to understand how the interaction between genes and environment increases or decreases cancer risk. In this area, she has studied how lifestyle factors such as diet and physical activity coupled with the genetic makeup of an individual impact their cancer risk. She has also worked on developing models that use genetic data to predict which individuals have a higher cancer risk.  In 2018, Mukherjee and her colleagues conducted a phenome-wide association study to see if the polygenic risk scores for different cancers are associated with multiple phenotypes. Their study showed that polygenic risk scores can help in stratifying the risk of different cancers in patients. Mukherjee and her study team has been modeling the transmission of the SARS-CoV-2 virus in India. This work has drawn significant attention from the media  and the scientific community.

Awards and honors 
2008 – 2009 – John G. Searle Assistant Professorship, University of Michigan
2011 – Elected Member, The International Statistical Institute
2012 – Fellow, American Statistical Association
2015 – John D. Kalbfleisch Collegiate Professorship, University of Michigan
2016 – Gertrude Cox Award, Washington Statistical Society
2016 – Elected Senior Fellow, Michigan Society of Fellows
2017 – Fellow, American Association for the Advancement of Science
2018 – 2019 – Fellow, Executive Leadership for Women in Academic Medicine (ELAM)
2018 – Distinguished Faculty Achievement Award, University of Michigan
2019 – Rogel Scholar Award, University of Michigan Rogel Cancer Center
2020 – Adrienne L Cupples Award, Boston University School of Public Health
2021 – Distinguished Women Scholars Award, Purdue University
2021 – Janet L Norwood Award, University of Alabama (Birmingham) School of Public Health
2022 – Sarah Goddard Power Award, University of Michigan 
2022 – Elected Member, The National Academy of Medicine.

Selected articles 
Sinha S, Mukherjee B, Ghosh M, Mallick BK, and Raymond JC. Bayesian semi-parametric analysis of matched case-control studies with missing exposure. Journal of the American Statistical Association, 100:591-601, 2005.
Mukherjee B and Chatterjee N. Exploiting gene-environment independence for analysis of case-control studies: An empirical-Bayes type shrinkage estimator to trade off between bias and efficiency. Biometrics, 64(3):685-94, 2008, .
Kastrinos F, Mukherjee B, Tayob N, Sparr J, Raymond VM, Wang F, Bandipalliam P, Stoffel EM, Gruber SB, Syngal S. The Risk of Pancreatic Cancer in Lynch Syndrome. Journal of the American Medical Association, 302(16):1790–95, 2009, PMCID: PMC4091624.
Mukherjee B, Ahn J, Gruber SB, and Chatterjee N. Testing gene-environment interaction in large-scale association studies: possible choices and comparison. American Journal of Epidemiology, 175(3):177-90, 2012, PMCID: PMC3286201. Discussion paper with invited commentary.
Mukherjee B, DeLancey JO, Raskin L, et al. Risk of Non-Melanoma Cancers in CDKN2A Mutation Carriers. The Journal of the National Cancer Institute, 104(12):953-56, 2012, PMCID: PMC3379723.
Sun Z, Tao Y, Li S, Ferguson KK, Meeker JD, Park SK, Batterman SA, Mukherjee B. Statistical strategies for constructing health risk models with multiple pollutants and their interactions: possible choices and comparison. Environmental Health, 12(1):85, 2013, PMCID: PMC3857674.
Boonstra PS, Mukherjee B and Taylor JMG. Bayesian shrinkage methods for partially observed high-dimensional data. The Annals of Applied Statistics, 7(4):2272–92, 2013, PMCID: PMC3891514.
He Z, Zhang M, Lee S, Smith JA, Guo X, Palmas W, Kardia SLR, Diez-Roux AV, Mukherjee B. Multi-marker tests for joint association in longitudinal studies using the genetic random field model. Biometrics, 71(3):606-15, 2015, PMCID: PMC4601568.
He Z, Zhang M, Lee S, Smith JA, Kardia SLR, Diez Roux AVD, Mukherjee B, Set-Based Tests for Gene-Environment Interaction in Longitudinal Studies. The Journal of the American Statistical Association, Application and Case Studies, 112(519):966-978, 2017, PMCID: PMC5954413.
Fritsche L, Gruber SB, Wu Z, Schmidt EM, Zawistowski M, Moser SE, Blanc V, Brummet C, Kheterpal S, Abecasis GA, Mukherjee B. Association of Polygenic Risk Scores for Multiple Cancers in a Phenomewide Study: Results from The Michigan Genomics Initiative,  The American Journal of Human Genetics, 102:1048–1061, 2018, PMCID: PMC5992124.
Beesley LJ, Mukherjee B. Statistical inference for association studies using electronic health records: handling both selection bias and outcome misclassification. Biometrics, 1-20,2020, PMID 33179768.
Ray D, Salvatore M, Bhattacharyya R, ...,Ghosh P. Mukherjee, B. Predictions, role of interventions and effects of a historic national lockdown in India's response to the COVID-19 pandemic: data science call to arms. Harvard Data Sci Rev. 2020;2020(Suppl 1), PMCID: PMC7326342.

References 

American people of Indian descent
University of Michigan faculty
Purdue University alumni
Living people
Presidency University, Kolkata alumni
Indian Statistical Institute alumni
1973 births
American statisticians
Women scientists from West Bengal